Tedo is a Georgian male given name. Notable people with this name include:

 Tedo Abzhandadze (born 1999), Georgian rugby union player
 Tedo Isakadze (born 1966), Georgian politician
 Tedo Japaridze (born 1946), Georgian politician
 Tedo Zhordania (1854–1916), Georgian historian, philologist, and educator
 Tedo Zibzibadze (born 1980), Georgian rugby union player